Our Beautiful Garden is Open is an album by pianist Anthony Coleman's Sephardic Tinge which was released on the Tzadik label in 2002.

Reception

In his review for Allmusic, Thom Jurek states "This is the best Sephardic Tinge disc yet".

Track listing
All compositions by Anthony Coleman except as indicated
 "Detritus" - 4:26  
 "Like Trees, Like Leaves ..." - 3:48  
 "El Sueno de la Hija del Rey" (Traditional Sephardic) - 4:10  
 "Et Dodim" (Traditional Sephardic) - 4:47  
 "Our Beautiful Garden is Open" - 9:12  
 "There is Nothing to Be Done" - 3:48  
 "Nani Nani" (Traditional Sephardic) - 4:17  
 "Youkali" (Kurt Weill, Roger Fernay) - 5:54
 "Scalerica de Oro" (Traditional Sephardic) - 3:34  
 "Adon Haslichot" (Traditional Sephardic) - 5:00

Personnel
Anthony Coleman - piano
Ben Street - bass 
Michael Sarin - drums

References

Tzadik Records albums
Anthony Coleman albums
2002 albums
Instrumental albums